Rastovac is a village in the Split-Dalmatia County, Croatia located in the Zagvozd municipality. In 2011 it was populated by 168 inhabitants.

References 

Populated places in Split-Dalmatia County
Zagvozd